The Cantonal Party (Spanish: Partido Cantonal, PCAN) is a Spanish cantonalist political party based in Cartagena, founded in 1976 among others, by Julio Frigard Romero and Carlos Romero Galiana, and currently a member of the political federation Citizen Movement of Cartagena.

External links 
 Official site

Cartagena, Spain
Political parties in the Region of Murcia
Political parties established in 1976
Cantonalism in Spain
1976 establishments in Spain